Eremococcus coleocola is a Gram-positive and facultatively anaerobic bacteria from the family of Eremococcus which has been isolated from the reproductive tract of horses in England.

References

Bacteria described in 1999
Lactobacillales